Ferro Corporation is an American producer of technology-based performance materials for manufacturers, focusing on four core segments: performance colors and glass; pigments, powders, and oxides; porcelain enamel; and tile coatings systems. Ferro was founded in 1919 by Harry D. Cushman in Cleveland. The company's headquarters are currently located in Mayfield Heights, Ohio.

In 2007, the company was listed as 844 on the Fortune 1000. As of 2011, Ferro operated 40 manufacturing facilities around the world.

Restatement
On January 18, 2005, Ferro Corporation updated the status of its investigation into inappropriate accounting entries in its Performance Chemicals business and its restatement process affecting fiscal years 2001, 2002 and 2003 and the first quarter of 2004.

On September 9, 2021, Ferro announced that its shareholders voted overwhelmingly to approve its acquisition by an affiliate of Prince International Corporation at a special meeting of Ferro shareholders.

The former businesses of the Ferro Corporation, Prince Minerals and Chromoflo merged together under the stewardship of Michael Wilson as Vibrantz Technologies.

See also 

 Printed electronics

References

External links
 

Mayfield Heights, Ohio
Companies formerly listed on the New York Stock Exchange
Manufacturing companies based in Ohio
Chemical companies established in 1919
Chemical companies of the United States
2022 mergers and acquisitions